The Dell Latitude series is a line of laptop computers manufactured and sold by American company Dell. It is a business-oriented line, aimed at corporate enterprises, healthcare, government, and education markets; unlike the Inspiron series, which is aimed at individual customers, and the Vostro series, which is aimed at smaller businesses. The Latitude directly competes with the Lenovo ThinkPad and the EliteBook series by HP. Additionally, the "Rugged (Extreme)", "XFR" and "ATG" models compete primarily with Panasonic's Toughbook line of "rugged" laptops.

Overview and product type

The Dell Latitude series have dropped the initial alphabet in newer model types (as in Latitude 7480 whose predecessor was E7470), and became the successor to the popular Latitude E, D, C, and X series. The Latitudes from the early 1990s up until the C*00 lines weren't in a set "series", instead of going under the models CP and XP with modifiers at the end, e.g.: XPi, CP M233.

In the past, the high-end line was the 6 series, being the C6x0, D6x0, and E64x0 lines, but as of 2015 this line has been discontinued and replaced by both the 5 series and the 7 series. The 15" "Premium" line was the 8 series, until the E-series merged this line with the 6 series (Model numbers being along the lines of C8x0 or D8x0). The entry-level line was the 5 series, but as of 2015 the 5 series and 7 series Latitude laptops are the primary lines of Latitude laptops. The 3 series has replaced the 5 series as the budget line. Dell has also since dropped the E from the Latitude line (due to switching to a USB C/Thunderbolt dock system, rather than the e-Port analog pin-system docks), and the models are delineated by number now, e.g.: Latitude 5480, 5570. The second number in the model (As in, 5470 or 7280) indicates the size of the screen on the laptop.

The current Dell Latitude lineup is as follows:

 Latitude 3xxx series. Budget models intended for education and small businesses, available in 13.3"/14"/15.6" trims.
 Latitude 5xxx series. Mainstream line. Replaces the 6000 series and shares same chassis with Mobile workstation models. available in 11.1"/12.5"/13.3"/14"/15.6" trims. 
 Latitude 7xxx series. "Premium" Ultrabooks, available in 12.5"/13.3"/14" trims only.
 Latitude 9xxx series. "Ultra-premium" laptops and 2-in-1s. Available with 14 and 15 inch displays and are the first laptops featuring 5G WWAN

Latitude computers are also differentiated in their feature sets, due to their business focus. For example, they often include security features such as smartcard and contactless smartcard, and TPM security, vPro and AMD Dash management, DisplayPort (as opposed to HDMI), Docking stations and support for legacy standards are all results of the requirements of the business market.

Some models also have the capability of Latitude ON which can be selected during the configuration of the laptop. Latitude ON is essentially a system within a system. It requires a separate add on module which contains its own microprocessor and Operating system. This allows the laptop to function in the realm of a Netbook.

Current models

(List does not include rugged modifications).

Dell used the "E-series" name up through the 2016 models, and new 2017 models drop the "E." and Dell E-Port Replicator with it. As of February 2017. Latitude computers are available in three series: the 3000, 5000, and 7000. The 3000 series is designed to be entry-level aimed at the education market and small businesses, This series did not exist prior to Haswell (xx40) as the Vostro Series was consolidated into the Latitude lineup to form the 3000 series. The 5000 series is mid-range. It includes a high-performance subseries whose model designations end in 1. These devices are available with higher-TDP (45w) processors, discrete graphics and NVMe SSDs. The 6000 series sat above the 5000 series. The 7000 series consists of high-end Ultrabook computers, introduced in 2014 with the Latitude E7440 and E7240 and replaced the existing high end 6000 series. Mobile workstation versions of Latitude used 5000 series instead of 6000 series.

Aside from the 3000, 5000, and 7000 series, Dell also provides an Education and Rugged Series of Latitude computers. The Education series laptops are designed for use in educational institutions and are geared towards office and internet based applications. The Rugged series laptops are similar to the previous Latitude XFR computers. They are designed with extra durability in mind.

xx30 Models (2022) 
Dell announced xx30 models on March 31, 2022.
 9430
 9330 
 7530
 7430
 7330
 7330 Ultralight
 5530
 5531
 5430
 5431
 5330
 3530
 3430
 3330

xx20 Models (2021) 
Dell announced xx20 models at CES 2021.
 9520
 9420
 7520
 7420
 7320
 5520
 5521
 5420
 5421
 5320
 3520
 3420
 3320
 3120

xx10 Models (2020) 
 9510 2-in-1: 15.0" lightweight 2-in-1
 9510: 15.0" Lightweight
 9410 2-in-1: 14.0" Lightweight 2-in-1
 7410 2-in-1: 14.0" Ultraportable 2-in-1
 7410: 14.0" Ultraportable
 7310 2-in-1: 13.3" Ultraportable 2-in-1
 7310: 13.3" Ultraportable
 7210 2-in-1: 12.3" Detachable 2-in-1
 5510: 15.6" Mainstream
 5511: 15.6" High Performance
 5410: 14.0" Mainstream
 5411: 14.0" High Performance
 5310 2-in-1: 13.3" Mainstream 2-in-1
 5310: 13.3" Mainstream
 3510: 15.6" Essential
 3410: 14.0" Essential
 3310 2-in-1: 13.3" Essential 2-in-1
 3310: 13.3" Education

Previous Models

xx00 Models (2019) 
 7400 2-in-1: 14.0" Ultraportable 2-in-1
 7400: 14.0" Ultraportable
 7300: 13.3" Ultraportable
 7200 2-in-1: 12.3" Detachable 2-in-1
 5501: 15.6" High-Performance
 5500: 15.6" Mainstream
 5401: 14.0" High-Performance 
 5400: 14.0" Mainstream
 5300 2-in-1: 13.3" Mainstream 2-in-1
 5300: 13.3" Mainstream
 3500: 15.6" Essential
 3400: 14.0" Essential (Celeron-4305U, 8th Gen Core i3-8145U/i5-8265U-8365U/i7-8565U)
 3301: 13.3" Essential
 3300: 13.3" Education

xx90 Models (2018) 
 7490: 14.0" Ultraportable (7th gen Core i3, 8th gen Core i5/i7)
 7390: 13.3" Ultraportable (7th gen Core i3/i5, 8th gen Core i5/i7)
 7390 2-in-1: 13.3" Ultraportable 2-in-1 (8th gen Core i3, 8th gen Core i5/i7)
 7290: 12.5" Ultraportable (7th gen Core i3/i5, 8th gen Core i5/i7)
 5591: 15.6" High-Performance (8th gen Core i5/i7)
 5590: 15.6" Mainstream (7th gen Core i3/i5, 8th gen Core i5/i7)
 5491: 14.0" High-Performance (8th gen Core i5/i7)
 5490: 14.0" Mainstream (7th gen Core i3/i5, 8th gen Core i5/i7)
 5495: 14.0" Mainstream (AMD Ryzen Pro Mobile: 3 2300U, 5 2500U, 7 2700U)
 5290: 12.5" Mainstream (8th gen Core i5/i7)
 5290 2-in-1: 12.3" Mainstream 2-in-1 (7th gen Core i3/i5, 8th gen Core i5/i7)
 3590: 15.6" Essential (7th gen Celeron/Core i3/i5, 8th gen Core i5/i7)
 3490: 14.0" Essential (6th gen Celeron-3865U,Core i3-6606U 7th gen Core i3-7130U/i5-7200U, 8th gen Core i5-8250U-8350U/i7-8550U)
 3390 2-in-1: 13.3" Essential 2-in-1 (7th gen Pentium/Core i3, 8th gen Core i5)

xx80 Models (2017) 
 7480: 14.0" Ultraportable (7th gen Core i3/i5/i7)
 7389: 13.3" 2-in-1 Ultraportable (7th gen core i3/i5/i7)
 7380: 13.3" Ultraportable (7th gen Core i3/i5/i7)
 7285: 12.3" Convertible Ultraportable (7th gen Core m3/m5/m7)
 7280: 12.5" Ultraportable (7th gen Core i3/i5/i7)
 5580: 15.6" Mainstream (7th gen Core i5/i7)
 5480: 14.0" Mainstream (7th gen Core i5/i7)
 5289: 12.5" Ultraportable 2-in-1, (7th gen Core i3/i5/i7)
 5285: 12.3" Convertible Ultraportable, detachable keyboard (7th gen Core i3/i5/i7)
 5280: 12.5" Mainstream (7th gen Core i5/i7)
 3580: 15.6" Essential (7th gen Celeron/Core i3/i5/i7)
 3480: 14.0" Essential (6th gen i3-6006U/i5-6200U 7th gen Celeron-3865U, Core i3-7100U/i5-7200U-7300U/i7-7500U)
 3380: 13.3" Essential (7th gen Celeron/Core i3/i5/i7)
 3189: 11.6" Education Convertible 2-in-1 (Pentium N4200 Intel 7265, Celeron N3350)
 3180: 11.6" Education (Celeron N3350)

Exx70 Models (2016) 
 E7470: 14.0" Ultraportable (6th gen Core i3/i5/i7)
 E7270: 12.5" Ultraportable (6th gen Core i3/i5/i7)
 7370: 13.3" Ultraportable (6th gen Core m3/m5/m7)
 7275: 12.5" Convertible Ultraportable (6th gen Core m3/m5/m7)
 E5570: 15.6" Mainstream (6th gen Core i5/i7)
 E5470: 14.0" Mainstream (6th gen Core i5/i7)
 E5270: 12.5" Mainstream (6th gen Core i5/i7)
 5175/9: 10.8" Ultraportable 2-in-1 (6th gen Core m5/m7)
 3570: 15.6" Essential (6th gen Celeron/Core i3/i5/i7)
 3470: 14.0" Essential (6th gen Celeron/Core i3/i5/i7)
 3370: 13.3" Essential (6th gen Core i3)
 3379: 13.3" Essential 2-in-1 (6th gen Core i3/i5)

Exx50 Models (2015) 
 E7450: 14.0" Ultraportable (5th gen Core i3/i5/i7)
 Latitude 13 7350: 13.3" Convertible Ultraportable 2-in-1 Tablet (5th gen Core M)
 E7250: 12.5" Ultraportable (5th gen Core i3/i5/i7)
 E5550: 15.6" Mainstream (5th gen Core i3/i5/i7)
 E5450: 14.0" Mainstream (5th gen Core i3/i5/i7)
 E5250: 12.5" Mainstream (5th gen Celeron/Core i3/i5/i7)
 E3550: 15.6" Essential (5th gen Celeron/Core i3/i5/i7)
 E3450: 14.0" Essential (5th gen Celeron/Core i3/i5/i7)

Exx40 Models (2013/2014) 
 E7440: 14.0" Ultraportable (4th gen Core i3/i5/i7 ULV)
 E7240: 12.5" Ultraportable (4th gen Core i3/i5/i7 ULV)
 E6540: 15.6" Mainstream (4th gen Core i3/i5/i7 Mobile)
 E6440: 14.0" Mainstream (4th gen Core i3/i5/i7 Mobile)
 E5540: 15.6" Mainstream (4th gen Core i3/i5/i7 ULV)
 E5440: 14.0" Mainstream (4th gen Core i3/i5/i7 ULV)
 E3540: 15.6" Essential (4th gen Core i3/i5/i7 ULV)
 E3440: 14.0" Essential (4th gen Core i3/i5/i7 ULV)

Exx30 Models (2012/2013) 

 E6530: 15.6" Mainstream (3rd gen Core i3/i5/i7)
 E6430: 14.0" Mainstream (3rd gen Core i3/i5/i7)
 E6330: 13.3" Mainstream (3rd gen Core i3/i5/i7)
 E6230: 12.5" Mainstream (3rd gen Core i3/i5/i7)
 E5530: 15.6" Essential (3rd gen Core i3/i5/i7)
 E5430: 14.0" Essential (2nd gen core i3) or (3rd gen Core i3/i5/i7)
 6430u: 14.0" Ultraportable (3rd gen Core i3/i5/i7)

Exx20 Models (2011/2012) 
 E6520: 15.6" Mainstream (2nd gen Core i3/i5/i7)
 E6420: 14.0" Mainstream (2nd gen Core i3/i5/i7)
 E6320: 13.3" Ultraportable (2nd gen Core i3/i5/i7)
 E6220: 12.5" Ultraportable (2nd gen Core i3/i5/i7)
 E5520: 15.6" Essential (2nd gen Core i3/i5/i7)
 E5420: 14.0" Essential (2nd gen Core i3/i5/i7)
 E5520m: 15.6" Value (Celeron/Core2Duo)
 E5420m: 14.0" Value (Celeron/Core2Duo)
 E6420 XFR: 14.0" Fully Rugged (2nd gen Core i5/i7)
 E6420 ATG: 14.0" Semi-Rugged (2nd gen Core i5/i7)

Exx10 Models (2010/2011) 
 E6510: 15.6" Mainstream (1st gen Core i3/i5/i7)
 E6410: 14.1" Mainstream (1st gen Core i3/i5/i7)
 E6410 ATG: 14.1" Semi-Rugged (1st gen Core i5/i7)
 E5510: 15.6" Essential (1st gen Core i3/i5/i7)
E5410: 14.1" Essential (1st gen Core i3/i5/i7)
E4310: 13.3" Ultraportable (1st gen Core i3/i5/i7)

Exx00 Models (2008/2009) 

 E6500: 15.4" Mainstream (Core 2 Duo)
 E6400: 14.1" Mainstream (Core 2 Duo)
 E6400 ATG: 14.1" Semi-Rugged (Core 2 Duo)
 E6400 XFR: 14.1" Fully Rugged (Core 2 Duo)
 E5500: 15.4" Essential (Celeron/Core 2 Duo)
 E5400: 14.1" Essential (Core 2 Duo)
 E4300: 13.3" Ultraportable (Core 2 Duo)
 E4200: 12.1" Ultraportable (Core 2 Duo)

Other Models

 XT3: 13.1" Convertible Touch Tablet & Pen (Core i3/i5/i7) –Release Date: August 2011
 XT2: 12.1" Convertible Touch Tablet & Pen (Core2Duo ULV)
 XT2 XFR: 12.1" Convertible Touch Tablet & Pen –Fully Rugged (Core2Duo ULV)
 2100 10.1" Netbook
 2110 10.1" Netbook
 2120 10.1" Netbook
 Z 16.0" Thin and Light

Latitude D-series 
The Latitude D-series was introduced in 2003, and discontinued in 2007. The models are the D4x0 (12.1" Ultra Mobile), D5x0 (14.1 or 15.0" standard aspect screen except for D531, plastic case, value model), D6x0 (14.1" Corporate model) and D8x0 (15.4" high-resolution model) most models are based on the Intel Core 2 Duo and the Intel Santa Rosa chipset, with the exception being the D531. Ever since the D420, D620, and D800, the D-series features wide-aspect LCD screens: 12.1", 14.1", and 15.4" respectively.

Latitude D6x0 series
The Latitude D6x0 series is the 14"/14.1" corporate model. It aims to combine heavy-duty power with reasonable portability, and differs primarily from D8x0 series in screen size. All are two spindle designs, with a "D/bay" modular bay which can interchange optical drives, a second hard drive, a floppy disk, a Zip drive, or a second battery. All models have a smart card socket, PCMCIA socket, 9-pin serial port, a "D-dock" port for a docking station or port replicator, and have an internal socket for an 802.11 wireless card.

The D600 and D610 share a common form factor, battery socket, and have a parallel printer port.

The D620 and D630 share a common form factor, battery socket, and do not have a parallel printer port. Both have support for an optional internal Bluetooth module, a socket for an optional mobile broadband card, and have an external switch for disabling any wireless connections.

Latitude D600

The D600 (and simultaneously introduced D800) was released on March 12, 2003. These were Dell's first laptops in the Latitude D-series, and also Dell's first business-oriented notebooks based on the Pentium-M (first-generation "Banias" or Dothan) chips and running on a 400 MT/s FSB on DDR memory. It had a PATA hard drive and a D-series modular bay, and used an ATI Radeon 9000 GPU. It had a 14" screen, in regular (non-widescreen) form factor. Unlike later D6x0 series machines, both memory sockets were accessible from a single cover on the bottom of the system.

Most, if not all Latitude models prior to the Latitude Dx20 series had a near-clone Inspiron, in the case of the D600, it was the Inspiron 600M. Differences include that the 600M does not work with the Dell D-Dock, and the case styling is slightly different. The motherboards, screens, and hard drive caddies are all physically interchangeable.

The Latitude D600 used a PA-10/PA-12 charger and came with a DVD drive, 2 x USB, 1 x TV, 1 x network, 1 x parallel, 1 x serial, and 1 monitor output. The hard drive is accessible through a cover on the left-hand front side of the lower case and is secured by 1 screw. After removing the screw, the hard drive can then slide out.

Latitude D610
The D610 (released in 2005) was an update of the D600 design; it used a slightly modified D600 chassis and a newer Pentium M chipset ("Sonoma" with 533 MT/s FSB). This chipset was the first Intel mobile chipset to use DDR2 Memory, versus the DDR in the Latitude Dx00 series. For space-saving purposes, instead of having both RAM chips on the bottom of the laptop, one RAM slot was moved to the top of the motherboard which could be accessed by removing the keyboard, whereas the other RAM slot remained in the area it had been located at previously. Unlike the D600 and prior midrange Latitudes (The 6xx series, dating back to the C-series) you had a choice of standard integrated Intel Graphics (GMA 900), or a discrete ATI solution (Radeon X300).

Latitude D610 Audio-Out "whining"
Some Dell Latitude D610 units with a dedicated ATI X300 graphics card seem to have problems with the audio-out jack. Symptoms of this problem include a noise or whine when an audio device is connected to the audio-out jack. Up to this date Dell does not have a clear solution to this problem.

Latitude D620

In March 2006, Dell introduced the D620 (and the D820), its first business-oriented notebook with a dual-core processor available. The D620 marked the transition from strictly 32-bit processing to opening-up the potential to run 64-bit operating systems and applications.  Initially available with the interim "Yonah" Core Duo (x86 32-bit) processors, it was later sold with the first-generation mobile "Merom" Core 2 (x86-64 64-bit) processor once those became available from Intel in the Fall of 2006; both run on a 667MT/s bus. So depending on the installed processor, a D620 can run x86-64 64-bit software. The D620 used a Socket-M for its motherboard and its CPU is possible to be upgraded. It was initially sold with Intel integrated graphics, but an option to upgrade to a discrete Nvidia GPU became available after a few months. It replaced the raised pointing stick with a "low profile" model and introduced the option of 4-cell and 9-cell batteries in addition to the standard 6-cell model. It uses DDR2 memory and is compatible with both PC2-4200 (533 MHz) and PC2-5300 (667 MHz) memory.

Although the D620 accepts a maximum of 4 GB of physical memory, it cannot be used fully, because of the 32-bit physical addressing limitation of the 945 Core 2 mobile chipsets [Intel-945GM/PM-chipset], (not related to the BIOS or the use of a 32-bit or 64-bit OS), restricts the usable memory by the operating system to 3.5 GB, or 3.3 GB with onboard video (memory is shared).

The D620 has one mono speaker located in the base below the touchpad. It has no option to expand to stereo without using external speakers or headphones.

There was no near-clone Inspiron model for the D620.

Latitude D630
Released in 2007, the D630 is an update of the D620 design. It differed most significantly in being based on the newer "Santa Rosa" (GM/PM965) mobile chipset which supported the 800MT/s models of the mobile Core 2 Duo (both the Merom 7xx0 series and later the Penryn-based 8x00/9x00 series). It also had newer versions of the graphics processor options, support for Intel's "Turbo Memory" flash cache (although this uses the same card slot as the mobile broadband card), and support for internal Wireless-N. It also [optionally?] added a 4-pin Firewire IEEE 1394 port. It uses DDR2 memory and is compatible with PC2-5300 (667 MHz) and PC2-6400 (800 MHz) memory.  The D630 unofficially will accept a maximum of 8 GB of physical memory, however, a BIOS update is required.

Unlike the D830, the D630 only has one speaker.

Latitude D620/D630 problems

 All early D620 models were known for faulty LCD screens. The early models suffered from light bleeding, where a black screen would show light bleeding in from the bottom of the screen. This wasn't fixed until almost a year into production. 
 In addition, some D630 screens are known for having bad LCD pixels. 
 They also have overheating issues: the D620/D630 and D820/D830 were available with an Intel integrated GMA or Nvidia graphics chip. The optional Nvidia graphics on this series of laptops are prone to overheating issues where the GPU would develop cracks in the solder. This was mostly due to temperature fluctuation but the graphics chips also ran much hotter than they were meant to. The failure manifests itself by stripes or "artifacts" on the LCD and also an external screen or by the total absence of an image. Even the D830 series, despite having more room for cooling the chip, suffered from the same issue. Some Nvidia models will eventually suffer from failure of the graphics chip due to the switch to lead-free solder and "underfill" of the BGA. The computer industry at the time had just switched to lead-free solders without redesigning cooling systems. This in turn led to undesirable heating cycles of the more brittle solder causing micro fractures to quickly form. Dell tried to prolong the lifetime of the Nvidia chips in these models with a BIOS update which causes the fan to run more often and thus reduce the strain from repeated heating/cooling cycles on the graphics chip. NVIDIA was found liable for these failures, causing a multi-million-unit recall, not only of some Dell notebooks, but also some HP, Compaq, and Apple products.

Latitude D630c
The D630c was a slight variant model of the D630, featuring a "manageable" version of the motherboard chipset unavailable on the standard D630.

Unlike the D630, the D630c model laptop could not be ordered with Intel graphics; it shipped only with the Nvidia graphics chip. As a result, all of the Latitude D630c laptops eventually fail.

It also could only be ordered with the Intel 4965AGN wireless card; it couldn't be configured with Dell's wireless options or lower end Intel wireless cards.

Latitude D631
The Latitude D631 (released in 2007), similar to the D531, was a variant of the Latitude Dx30 series that had AMD processors instead of Intel. However, the D631 is very rare inside the United States due to it not being an option to order on Dell's website. You can find some that originated in the United States, but those were special ordered over the phone. They were sold alongside the D630 as standard equipment in select international countries, but while not being that rare internationally, they didn't sell as many units as the D630 series (and even the D630c series) laptops did. As a result, not much information about specific chipsets, graphics chip options (If there were any), or any other features can be found online for specifying details.

Latitude D8x0 series
The Latitude D8x0 series is the 15.4" corporate model; unlike the D600 and D610, all feature a widescreen form factor. All are two spindle designs, with a "D-bay" modular bay which can interchange optical drives, a floppy module, a second hard drive, or a second battery. All models have a smart card socket, PCMCIA socket, and 9-pin serial port, a "D-dock" port for docking station or port replicator, and have an internal socket for an 802.11 wireless card.

The D800 was Dell's first widescreen Latitude notebook.

The D8x0 series models roughly parallel the technology in the D6x0 models other than for screen size; they do not share a battery form factor with the D6x0 series. The D820 and D830 add an ExpressCard socket, not available in the D6x0 series. The D830 is capable of accepting 8 GB of physical memory with updated firmware.

The D800 equated to the Precision M60, and the D810 to the Precision M70. They were for all intents and purposes identical except for the graphics card, certification, and in the case of the M70, the lid.

The near-clone Inspirons for the D800 and D810 were the Inspiron 8500 and 8600; the D820 and D830 share hardware with Precision models M65 and M4300 respectively. There are even known cases of "mixed-mode" samples of the latter, where the Dell-recorded type according to the service tag and markings differs from the BIOS-reported type with an identical service tag.

Both Latitude D820 and D830 have stereo speakers mounted on both sides of the keyboard.

Latitude D5x0 series
The Latitude D500 series is a set of "entry-level" business models; they are built on a 15" non-widescreen form factor, although models before the D530 were sold with both 14.1" and 15" screens (the 14.1" having a wider bezel.) They are 2-spindle devices (removable optical drive interchangeable with D6xx/D8xx machines), and roughly follow the technical generations (chipset and processor-wise) of the D6x0 and D8x0 series. The D530 was Dell's last non-widescreen Latitude model.

The Latitude D531 was also available, being the cheapest Latitude available at the time due to using AMD processors and cutting back on a few features. It was essentially a D830 with, no TrackPoint, no smartcard reader, an option for a 14" screen (If this was chosen it would have a similar wider bezel as on the earlier D5xx series machines), and an AMD-based motherboard. It does keep some premium features from the D830, such as a magnesium chassis, support for a 2nd battery, and a SATA based interface for the hard drive, allowing people to upgrade to a much faster SSD for cheap. DVD Drives, Screen Assemblies (If the laptop was ordered with the 15" screen), RAM, and Hard Drives/Caddies were interchangeable.

Latitude D4x0 series
The Dell Latitude D4x0 series of ultraportable laptops were first released in 2003 with the D400 and discontinued in 2007 with the D430. In order to make the laptops small and lightweight, some changes were made, such as ultra low voltage (ULV) CPU's, removal of the modular bay, no dedicated graphics, and in later models, 1.8 inch hard drives instead of the industry standard 2.5 inch. While the D8x0, D6x0, and D5x0 models were all introduced simultaneously with each generation, the D4x0 series were generally introduced a couple of months after their counterparts. Also, since they use ULV (ultra-low-voltage) processors and chipsets, and are generally less powerful, the technology does not correspond as closely as it does between other models in each generation — for example, the D420/D430 uses parallel ATA hard drives (1.8") rather than the SATA (2.5") interface in the D520/620/820. In 2008, the D4x0 series was replaced by E4200 and E4300 models.

Dell Latitude D400/D410 
The D400 was released in 2003 with a ULV Banias Pentium M, Intel 855GM chipset, 128MB of RAM (up to a max of 2GB) and a choice of 20, 30, and 40GB 4,200 RPM hard drives, The D400 had a design that was similar to the D600, including a 4:3 non widescreen 1,024x768 12" display. The computer could be configured with Windows XP Home or Professional, or Windows 2000 Professional.

The Dell Latitude D410 was released in 2005. It introduced a new design, newer ULV Dothan Pentium M's, and a Trusted Platform Module (TPM). It shares the rest of its hardware with the D400.

Dell Latitude D420/D430 
The Dell Latitude D420 was released in 2006 and introduced many new features. Some of them include support for Intel's new Core architecture, 12.1 inch widescreen displays, options for 3G cellular connectivity and a 64GB SSD option. The D420 came with either an Intel Core Solo U1300 ULV 1.06 GHz, Intel Core Duo U2400 ULV 1.06 GHz or Intel Core Duo U2500 ULV 1.2 GHz. Unlike its bigger D620 brother, the D420's CPU was a soldered-in BGA and therefore is not upgradable. The Dell Latitude D420/D430 use 1.8 inch hard drives similar to those used in the Apple iPod Classic.

The D430 came out a year later in 2007, and was the last laptop in the D4x0 line. The D430 came with either an Intel Core Solo U1400 ULV 1.2 GHz or Intel Core 2 Duo U7600 1.2 GHz; the U7700 Processor (1.33 GHz) was later made available as an option. The D430 also have soldered-in BGA CPU's and are not upgradable without changing the motherboard.

In a 22C° ambient the D430 U7700 processor has been measured to run from 62C° at idle to 85C° under heavy system loads, that is, within 10C° of Intel's max. temperature rating for the processor.

D/Bay modules 

The Dell Latitude D-series laptops support swapping out the optical drive with select modules available from Dell. Available were a CD-ROM, DVD-ROM/CD-RW and a DVD+-RW optical disk drives, along with a 2nd hard drive, 2nd battery, floppy drive and Iomega Zip 250 drive. An external enclosure branded as the D/Bay was available, allowing users to use modules on Latitudes that didn't have internal bays, such as the Latitude D4xx series of ultraportable laptops. The enclosure uses a special type of USB port only available on certain Latitudes(D4x0 series)

The Iomega Zip 250 module was released as the successor to the similar module for the Latitude C-series. When the modules came out in 2003, at the start of the D-series lifespan, Iomega was discontinuing the Zip format. As such, this module is very rare, and was only on sale for a few months after it came out. Newer Latitude laptops detect it as a CD-ROM drive within the BIOS, but within an operating system, the zip disks are detected as standard removable drives.

NVidia GPU problems
Many D620/D630 and D820/D830 models (and related Precision models) with NVidia mobile GPUs may experience graphics failure. A Class Action Lawsuit settlement by NVidia was reached where certain Dell models were provided with replacement motherboards at no expense.

Recall affecting D Series batteries
Dell posted notices to many of their laptop customers on August 14, 2006, saying that the Sony batteries on the D410, D500, D505, D510, D520, D600/D610, D620, and D800/D810 models were prone to bursting into flames, or even exploding.

The batteries on any of these computers purchased between April 2004 and July 18, 2006 were supposed to be removed and the computers run on AC power until replacements arrived. Problematic Sony batteries led to battery recall programs at other laptop companies, including Hitachi, Toshiba, Lenovo (IBM) and Apple.

Latitude C series
The Latitude C-series notebooks covered the range of processors from the Pentium 166 MHz to the Pentium 4-M. Models in this series included the CP (Pentium processors), CPi (Pentium II processors), CPx, CSx, C600 and C800 (Mobile Pentium III processors), CPt, C500 and C510 (Celeron processors), C400, C610 and C810 (Pentium 3-M processors) and C640 and C840 (Mobile Pentium 4-M).

C series laptops were notable for their consistent and interchangeable accessories across this wide range of processors. The series was one of the first to offer the UXGA 1600x1200 resolution display and included a NVidia GeForce MX400 32 MB video accelerator to complement the display requirements. A robust design made it a favorite in harsher climates; however, this design lacked the visual appeal of many of its competitors.

The most popular of the C-series included the C800, C810, C840, and later the C640.

The later C-series models mostly had near clones sold as the Inspiron 4000 and 8000 series:
 C840 cloned as the Inspiron 8200 and Precision M50
 C810 cloned as the Inspiron 8100 and Precision M40
 C800 cloned as the Inspiron 8000
 C640 cloned as the Inspiron 4150
 C610 cloned as the Inspiron 4100
 C600 cloned as the Inspiron 4000
 CPxJ cloned as the Inspiron 3800
 CPxH cloned as the Inspiron 3700

An interesting note on the C840 is that it was the last Dell notebook (along with its sister models the Inspiron 8200 and Precision M50) to have both a "fixed" optical drive as well as a modular bay, making it a "three-spindle" notebook. The modular bay could also be used for a second battery identical to the primary battery rather than a special modular bay battery. It used a Pentium 4-M processor and DDR SDRAM.
The Dell C840 can support up to one gigabyte of RAM in each of two slots, for a total of two gigabytes in all. The GPU can also be upgraded on the C840/M50/i8200, from a GeForce2 Go to the Quadro4 Go 700 from the Precision M50.

Rugged models
The Latitude ATG was a semi-rugged version of the D620, and was Dell's only semi-rugged offering, while their fully rugged offering originally consisted of the Augmentix XTG630, a D630 in a fully rugged case, and later the D630 XFR. The ATG as well as the XFR have a protective glass glued on top of the screen that often has glue leaking onto the display causing air bubbles to form.

Latitude XT  series
The Latitude XT was a touch-screen convertible-tablet computer series.

Latitude XT 
In July 2008, Dell released multi-touch touch-screen drivers for the Latitude XT Tablet, claiming the "industry's first convertible tablet with multi-touch capabilities."[11] Dell has partnered with N-trig, providers of DuoSense technology, combining pen, capacitive touch and multi-touch in a single device. N-trig's DuoSense dual-mode digitizer uses both pen and zero-pressure capacitive touch to provide a true hands-on computing experience for mobile computers and other digital input products over a single device.

Latitude XT problems
A large number of user reports suggest that the Dell Latitude XT suffers from a major problem. The N-Trig digitizer interfaces to the XT by an internal USB port. Users report that any other USB device which is plugged in may, and usually does, prevent the N-Trig applet (program which controls the features) from identifying the N-Trig hardware. In addition, there have been reports that certain other drivers, such as iTunes Helper, may cause this or a similar problem. Other users report no problems from iTunes. According to the reports, this still leaves the dual sense but without Multi-Touch and other advanced features, "which render the auto and dual mode useless. The digitizer will only start working again after consecutive reboots." There have also been reports that the driver may crash, catastrophically or non-catastrophically, leaving no screen input at all. A re-boot may solve the problem, but often users found that the driver installation is damaged, requiring a re-installation of the drivers. But the install program will not un-install if it doesn't recognize the N-Trig hardware. In this case, the alternatives are (1) restore the entire operating system from backup, (2) manually un-install by erasing all N-Trig programs and drivers then editing the registry to remove all references to N-Trig, then re-install the N-Trig software, or (3) do a complete re-install of Windows.

These problems have been reported both with XP and Vista, 32 and 64 bit. In addition, Dell sells a MediaBase with an internal DVD drive. The drive also interfaces by way of a USB connection inside the MediaBase. Most, but not all, users of the MediaBase report that it prevents the drivers from loading.

Latitude XT2

Latitude XT3 

2012's 13.3"model.

Technical specifications
The majority of Latitude laptops are built to order.

Operating System: Windows, FreeDOS, or Ubuntu for some models.

Processor package

Audio codec

3xxx, 5xxx, 7xxx, 9xxx Series (2017-current)

Z-Family (2009)

E-Family (2007-2017)

D-Family (2003-2007)

X-Family (2002-2011)

V-Family (2000-2002)

C-Family (1999-2002)
All screens have a TN active-LCD matrix and a CCFL backlit.

L-Family (1999-2006)
All screens have a TN active-LCD matrix and a CCFL-backlit.

CS-Family (1998-1999)

CP-Family (1997-1999)

XP-Family (1994-1998)
The Latitude XP was introduced as the first laptop with an optional Lithium-ion battery. For XPi and earlier models, the BIOS limited storage to an 8.4gb or smaller hard drive. The XPi CD was the last mass-market laptop with an optical trackball. In 1996, the XP line was updated with higher resolution screens and updated Pentium processors. A base model for business use known as LM was introduced, while the high-end models were renamed XPi. In 1997, the range would be upgraded to include Intel's MMX.

History
Announcements:

E-Family
2020: 18 June: E7270. E7470, E7870
2012: 21 May: E6230, E6330, E6430, E6430s, E6530, E5430, E5440, E5510,E5530, E6430 ATG
2011: 8 Feb: E5420, E5520, E6220, E6320, E6420, E6520, E6420 ATG laptops and XT3 convertible tablet
2010: 8 April: E6410, E6510, E6410 ATG
2008: 12 August: E-Family (E4200, E4300, E5400,E6500 E5500, E6400, E6400 ATG)

D-Family
2007: 28 June: D430; 9 May: D630, D830, D531; 16 January: ATG D620 announced
2006: 20 June: D420; 2 May: D520; 29 March: D620, D820 announced
2005: 26 April: D510; 1 February: D410, D610 and D810 announced
2004: 12 January: D505 announced
2003: 19 May: D400; 10 April: D500; 12 March: D-family (D600, D800) announced

C-Family
2002: 11 July: C640 announced
2001: 12 November: C400 announced
2000: 25 September: C600, C800 announced
1999: 25 October: CPx H500GT and CPt V466GT announced(Some of the earlier Dell laptops lacked a built-in Ethernet network adapter well into the Internet age, CPx H500GT was one such model); 23 August: CS-line (R400XT);14 June: CPi R400GT, CPi A400XT, and CPi A366ST; 4 May: CPt-line; 5 January: CPi A366XT and A300ST announced
 CPi D266XT (BIOS Ph 7/30/98-2001): PII-266, 512 KB cache, Intel i440BX; 13.3 1024×768 TFT; 256 MB max, 2 EDO SoDIMM slots; 4 - 20+ GB, two PCMCIA, two modular bays, PS/2, VGA, parallel, USB 1.1, audio in/out. Windows 98.
 1997: C-family announced (with CP-line)

XPi-Family
 1996: Latitude XPi P133ST (NeoMagic NM2070 video chipset, 24MB of memory (8MB soldered), 1.2 GB hard disk, PCMCIA modem card, 10.2" SVGA (800x600) TFT display, Windows 95 with possibility to partition and install Linux, Desktop Survival Guide)

Ultraportable
2007: 28 June: D430 announced
2005: 30 March: X1 announced
2003: 29 July: X300 announced
2002: 6 May: X200 announced
2000 4 October: LS H500ST announced

Value
2006: 6 November: 131L;23 March: 120L announced
2005: 8 March: 110L announced
2004: 13 April: 100L announced
The Latitude 100L is a near-clone of the Inspiron 1150 and is also closely related to the 1100,5100,and 5150.
The Latitude 110L is a near-clone of the Inspiron 1000.

Repairability 
The Dell Latitude E5270 (2017) scored a perfect 10 on iFixit. It is unclear whether other Latitude laptops have a similar form factor and are equivalently modular.

See also 

 Lenovo ThinkPad
 HP EliteBook and Zbook
 Dell Latitude, Precision and XPS
 Fujitsu Lifebook and Celsius
 Toshiba Tecra

References

External links

 Dell USA Medium & Large Business, Latitude Notebooks

Latitude
Consumer electronics brands
Computer-related introductions in 1994
Business laptops